The A642 is a short motorway in the Athens metropolitan area, Greece. It forms a connection between the northern beltway the A6 (Attiki Odos) and the eastern beltway A62 (Hymettus Peripheral Road). Its length is 2 km.

On 4 December 2015, the Greek government proposed to renumber the A642 as the A621: In practice, the renumbering did not take place, because road signs still show the motorway as the A642.

Exit list 

Source: Attiki Odos, Motorway Exitlists

References

642
Roads in Attica
Buildings and structures in Athens
Transport in Athens